De La Concorde may refer to:

De La Concorde station, an intermodal transit station in Laval, Quebec, Canada
Place de la Concorde, a public park in Paris
Pont de la Concorde (disambiguation)

See also
Concorde (disambiguation)